There are several rivers named São João River in Brazil:

 São João River (Canoas River tributary), Santa Catarina state
 São João River (Cubatão River tributary), Paraná state
 São João River (Iguazu River tributary), Paraná state
 São João River (Ji-Paraná River tributary), Rondônia state
 São João River (Mato Grosso do Sul), Mato Grosso do Sul state
 São João River (Mato Grosso), Mato Grosso state
 São João River (Minas Gerais), Minas Gerais state
 São João River (Negro River tributary), Santa Catarina state
 São João River (Paraná River tributary), Paraná state
 São João River (Dos Patos River tributary), Paraná state
 São João River (Pernambuco)
 São João River (Pitangui River tributary), Paraná state
 São João River (Rio de Janeiro), Rio de Janeiro state
 São João River (Verde River tributary), Rondônia state
 Igarapé São João
 São João da Barra River, Mato Grosso state
 São João de Meriti River, Rio de Janeiro state
 São João do Paraíso River, Minas Gerais state
 São João Grande River, Espírito Santo state
 São João Pequeno River, Espírito Santo state
 São João Surrá River, Paraná state